Juan Pedro Lanzani (born 24 August 1990), most known as Peter Lanzani, is an Argentine actor and singer and former child model. He is best known for his role on the Cris Morena television series Casi Ángeles playing Thiago Bedoya Agüero, and as a member of the music group Teen Angels. He is also known for his roles in Argentina 1985 by Santiago Mitre and El Clan by Pablo Trapero.

Early life
Juan Pedro Lanzani was born on August 24, 1990, in the Belgrano neighborhood of Buenos Aires. He studied at the Belgrano Day School and at the Annunciation Institute of María. He has three brothers. Lanzani used to play rugby in the Rugby team 'Alumni' during childhood, like his father and brothers, but although he dropped it due to his pursuit of an actor career, he still plays occasionally in his free time.

Career  
In 2004, began his career as a model for Mimo & Co. In 2006, made his television debut playing Tábano on the Argentine series Chiquititas produced by Cris Morena, starring Jorgelina Aruzzi and Gaston Ricaud, which aired on Telefe.

In 2007 to 2010, Lanzani played the title role of Thiago Bedoya Agüero in Casi Angeles. The series, which became one of the most popular programs on television, was also adapted for theater. Performances were held at the Gran Rex Theater, where it broke box office records and became "the second most seen play in the history of Argentine theater." In a survey conducted in the electronic version of the Argentine newspaper La Nación, Peter Lanzani was chosen as the "best of the small screen heartthrob 2010".

In 2011, he played opposite Facundo Arana in the comedy Cuando Me Sonreís.

In 2012, Lanzani played Eliseo Lacroix, grandson of the protagonist (Mirtha Legrand), in the miniseries La Dueña. The series began in April and ended in November of that year. In June 2012, he made a special appearance on the telenovela Dulce Amor, starring Carina Zampini and Sebastian Estevanez, in where he played Fede. The series began its run in April and ended in November of the same year.

The following year, Lanzani received a proposal from Cris Morena, who gave him his first job in television to star in the series Aliados which started airing on Telefe in June 2013.

In 2015 he filmed his first movie with Guillermo Francella; The Clan. It is inspired by a notorious true-life crime syndicate, the Puccio family.

Musical career  

Acting in Casi Angeles led to Lanzani becoming a member of the pop band Teen Angels, formed by the main cast of the series: Lali Espósito, Eugenia Suárez (later replaced by Rocío Igarzábal), Nicolas Riera and Gastón Dalmau.

Filmography

Theater

Discography

Awards and nominations

References

External links 

 
 
 
 Juan Pedro Lanzani on VK

1990 births
21st-century Argentine male actors
21st-century Argentine male singers
Argentine male stage actors
Argentine male television actors
Argentine people of Italian descent
Living people
Singers from Buenos Aires